"The Diplomat's Club" is the 108th episode of NBC sitcom Seinfeld. This is the 22nd episode for the sixth season. It aired on May 4, 1995. The episode was the final appearance of Mr. Pitt as a recurring character (though he appears as a guest in the series finale), as he comes to suspect Elaine of plotting to kill him in order to receive the benefits from his will. In the episode's other plotlines, Jerry takes an ill-fated trip to Ithaca with an overly pampering assistant, Kramer returns to his gambling habit by betting on flight arrivals, and George tries to prove he is not racist by getting a black friend.

Plot
Elaine plans to tell Mr. Pitt she is quitting, but when he tells her that he's added her to his will, she is touched and instead reminds him to consult a pharmacist before taking cold medicine, to be sure it is safe to mix with his heart medication. Mr. Pitt goes to the pharmacy and mistakes Jerry for a pharmacist, as he is re-stocking a display that Kramer knocked over. Jerry approves of mixing the medications. Mr. Pitt collapses due to the combination of medications.

Jerry plans to meet Bridgette, his girlfriend, at an airport lounge called the Diplomat's Club after returning from a gig in Ithaca, New York. In Ithaca, Jerry's pampering assistant Katie warns him the pilot is in the audience, which makes Jerry nervous, causing him to perform poorly. Katie harangues the pilot, blaming him for the mishap. When Jerry tries to fly back to New York, the pilot throws him off the plane. Katie rents a car and tries to drive Jerry back, but gets lost and drives into a swimming pool. Kramer, loitering in the Diplomat's Club waiting for Jerry to return from Ithaca, meets a Texan, Earl Haffler, with whom he starts making bets on aircraft arrival times. Owing thousands of dollars to Earl, Kramer calls Newman to bring serial killer David "Son of Sam" Berkowitz's mail bag to the airport to serve as collateral so they can go double or nothing on the flight from Ithaca. Kramer enters a winning streak, and soon it is Earl who owes him thousands.

George tries to flatter his boss, Morgan, by telling him that he looks like Sugar Ray Leonard. Morgan questions whether George has a racial bias when he looks at black people. Outraged at the implication, George plans to prove Morgan wrong by producing a black friend. He tries befriending various black people he has met in the past or bumps into on the street. He finally gets Karl, the exterminator who fumigated Jerry's apartment in "The Doodle". He brings him to dinner at a restaurant where Morgan is eating. The plot backfires when Karl admits he is an exterminator and Morgan leaves in disgust. When George calls for the check, a black waiter says "Sugar Ray Leonard can eat here on the house", which sends him sprinting after Morgan.

Jerry calls Mr. Pitt's office to ask Elaine to meet Bridgette at the Diplomat's Club. While there she tells Kramer that Jerry caused a disturbance on the flight from Ithaca, delaying the flight by an hour. When Earl hears this, he thinks the bet was rigged, and tears up his check to Kramer. Mr. Pitt sees TV news coverage of the swimming pool incident, and recognizes Jerry as the "pharmacist". His estate lawyer remembers that Jerry called for Elaine, and assumes that they are in a plot to kill him, now that she is in his will, leading Pitt to fire Elaine.

Jerry and Bridgette finally meet in the Club just before her plane leaves. As they begin to kiss, the reappearance of the pilot as his plane pulls alongside the window unnerves Jerry.

Production
Coming back from a stand-up tour, Jerry Seinfeld told the Seinfeld crew about how his management warned him right before a performance that the pilot of the flight he'd just been on was in the audience. Writers Tom Gammill and Max Pross decided to write an episode based around the idea of Jerry getting freaked out by the pilot, with subplots proceeding from Jerry, through well-intentioned actions, causing disaster for the entire cast (e.g. getting Elaine fired by helping Mr. Pitt at the pharmacy, enabling George to humiliate himself by giving him the contact information for Karl the exterminator). After an unsatisfactory round of auditions for the part of the pilot, the role was given to a delivery man bringing the Seinfeld crew Sparkletts bottled water because he looked like a pilot.

The titular "Diplomat's Club" in the episode is based on the Admirals Club run by American Airlines.

Due to the ambitious settings, "The Diplomat's Club" was the first episode of Seinfeld for which no scenes were filmed live before a studio audience. Most of the footage was shot at Burbank Airport, which was shut down for the shooting because several of the airport management were Seinfeld fans. The cheapest scene in the episode, Jerry "freaking out" in front of news cameras, was accomplished with nothing more than some rented bushes set in front of a black backdrop.

Newman did not appear in the original script for the episode; his part was added in by Seinfeld creators Larry David and Jerry Seinfeld.

During filming of an earlier episode, Larry David remarked to Gammill and Pross that Tom Wright, who played Mr. Morgan, looks like Sugar Ray Leonard, inspiring the George story in the episode. Originally this story was to end with George being demoted to working the ticket window at Yankee Stadium, where Sugar Ray Leonard comes to pick up his tickets. Because the Seinfeld team were unable to get Leonard to appear on the show, the part with the black waiter was written as a substitute ending, though the ticket window scene was filmed with Wright as Leonard's stand-in.

References

External links 
 

Seinfeld (season 6) episodes
1995 American television episodes